PureWow is an American digital media company that publishes women's lifestyle content. Acquired by serial entrepreneur Gary Vaynerchuk in 2017 as part of Gallery Media Group, PureWow tailors lifestyle topics for Millennials and Generation X, including fashion, beauty, home decor, recipes, entertainment, travel, technology, literature, wellness and money.

History 

PureWow was founded by Ryan Harwood in September 2010, along with Bob Pittman's Pilot Group and the women of wowOwow Joni Evans, Mary Wells Lawrence, Whoopi Goldberg, Liz Smith, Candice Bergen, and Lesley Stahl, among others. In January 2013, PureWow hired former Real Simple editor Mary Kate McGrath as its first editor-in-chief. In August 2014, PureWow was listed as no. 352 on Inc. Magazine's 2014 list of the top 500 fastest-growing privately owned companies. In May 2015, PureWow raised $2.5 million.

In 2017, serial entrepreneur Gary Vaynerchuk and Miami Dolphins' owner Stephen Ross' venture firm, RSE Ventures, acquired PureWow to form Gallery Media Group as a creative agency and media firm. PureWow's CEO, Ryan Harwood serves as the chief executive of Gallery Media Group.

Editions 

PureWow publishes national content as well as local content for New York City, Los Angeles, Chicago, San Francisco, Dallas, and the Hamptons. The company publishes content across fashion, beauty, homecare topics, technology, entertainment, books, wellness and finances. PureWow articles are distributed via its website PureWow.com, email, and over social media channels.

Reception

PureWow's executives have appeared on Fox News, Good Day New York, Today Show, New York Live, and Bloomberg TV to discuss fashion and native advertising topics. Forbes magazine highlighted PureWow's audience growth in an interview with PureWow CEO Ryan Harwood. The company's growth to four million readers earned PureWow features in Fortune's Brainstorm Tech Startup Idol, one of Paradigm Next's Featured Fridays, and Crain's New York Business.

References 

Digital media
Companies based in New York (state)